Marine Fighter Attack Squadron 134 (VMFA-134) was a reserve F/A-18 Hornet squadron in the United States Marine Corps. Known as "Smoke", the squadron was based at Marine Corps Air Station Miramar, California and fell under Marine Aircraft Group 46 (MAG-46) and the 4th Marine Aircraft Wing (4th MAW).  On April 1, 2007, the squadron was transitioned to cadre status and its gear and personnel were redistributed throughout the remaining F/A-18 Hornet squadrons.

Mission
Conduct air-to-air and air-to-ground operations in support of U.S. Marine Corps ground troops.

History

World War II

Marine Scout Bombing Squadron 134 (VMSB-134) was activated on May 1, 1943, at Marine Corps Air Station Santa Barbara, California, and assigned to Marine Base Defense Aircraft Group 42, Marine Fleet Air, West Coast.  Shortly thereafter it was redesignated as Marine Torpedo Bombing Squadron 134 (VMTB-134) on June 1, 1943.  From October to November 1943 the squadron deployed to Espiritu Santo, New Hebrides, and detached from the Marine Base Defense Aircraft Wing.  In November 1943 the squadron was reassigned to Marine Aircraft Group 11, 1st Marine Aircraft Wing.

During the course of World War II the squadron supported operations on Bougainville, the Bismarck Archipelago and Peleliu.  Following these campaigns the squadron went through numerous reassignments to include the following:
Reassigned during January 1944 to Marine Aircraft Group 24.
Reassigned during March 1944 to Marine Aircraft Group 14.
Reassigned during May 1944 to Marine Aircraft Group 12.
Reassigned during June 1944 to Marine Aircraft Group 11, 2nd Marine Aircraft Wing.
Reassigned during December 1944 to Marine Aircraft Group 11, 4th Marine Aircraft Wing.

Following the war, VMTB-134 was assigned to Tsingtao, China during October 1945 to participate in the occupation of Northern China from October 1945 to April 1946.  During this time they were again reassigned in November 1945 to Marine Aircraft Group 32, 1st Marine Aircraft Wing and to Marine Aircraft Group 12 in April 1946 upon their return from China.  The squadron was deactivated on April 30, 1946.

1958-1986

The squadron was reactivated on April 15, 1958, at Naval Air Station Los Alamitos, California, as Marine Fighter Squadron 134  (VMF-134) in the Marine Air Reserve.

Redesignated again on July 1, 1962, as Marine Attack Squadron 134 (VMA-134), Marine Air Reserve Training Detachment, Marine Air Reserve Training Command, Los Alamitos, California.  In February 1965 they were again reassigned to Marine Aircraft Group 43, 4th Marine Aircraft Wing.  1971 saw the squadron move to Marine Corps Air Station El Toro, California, assigned to Marine Aircraft Group 46, flying Douglas A-4F (Skyhawk) aircraft and with squadron designation of, [the] Skyhawks.  The last redesignation of the squadron occurred on October 1, 1983, as Marine Fighter Attack Squadron 134 with transition to the F-4 Phantom II, still attached to MAG 46.

1990s & 2000s
On July 21, 2004, two F/A-18 Hornets of VMFA-134 suffered a mid-air collision over the Columbia River, 120 miles east of Portland, Oregon, shortly after 1430, killing both Marines in F/A-18B, BuNo 162870. The pilot of F/A-18A, BuNo 163097, 'MF-04', ejected and landed nearby on a hillside west of Arlington, Oregon, suffering minor injuries.  The fighters were on their way to the Boardman Air Force Range, where the Oregon Air National Guard trains, when they collided. Another spokesman told the Associated Press that the planes were on a low-altitude training exercise.

In Popular Media
In the seventh season episode of The West Wing "The Mommy Problem" an F/A-18 with the call sign 'Badger' belonging to VMFA-134 is shown being piloted by Democratic presidential candidate Matt Santos (Jimmy Smits) as part of his USMC Reserve duty.

Awards
  Navy Unit Commendation Streamer
 Peleliu - 1944
  Asiatic - Pacific Campaign Streamer with Three Bronze Stars
  World War II Victory Streamer
  China Service Streamer

See also

 United States Marine Corps Aviation
 List of United States Marine Corps aircraft squadrons
 List of decommissioned United States Marine Corps aircraft squadrons

References
Notes

External links
 VMFA-134's official website
 VMA-134 page at www.skyhawk.org

Fighter attack squadrons of the United States Marine Corps
cadre